502nd may refer to:

Fiction
 502nd Joint Fighter Wing "Brave Witches" - a fictional air force unit in the anime series Brave Witches

Military
502nd Heavy Tank Battalion (Germany), a German World War II independent armored battalion equipped with heavy tanks
502nd Infantry Regiment (United States) (502nd PIR), a regiment of the 101st Airborne Division of the United States Army
502nd SS Jäger Battalion, a Nazi Germany special forces unit from 1943 to 1944
502nd Tactical Control Group, a United States Air Force unit that fought in the Korean War

See also
502 (number)
502 (disambiguation)
502, the year 502 (DII) of the Julian calendar
502 BC